James Aronson (1915–1988) was an American journalist. He founded the National Guardian. He was a graduate of Harvard College and the Columbia University Graduate School of Journalism.

Career 
Aronson, known as "Jim" to his friends, worked at several publications prior to founding the National Guardian. He worked on the staffs of the Boston Evening Transcript, the New York Herald Tribune, the New York Post and The New York Times from 1946 to 1948.

Aronson founded the National Guardian in 1949 with John T. McManus and Cedric Belfrage. It continued publishing until 1992.

Aronson also worked as a professor at Hunter College of the City University of New York. In 1981 he was invited to mainland China to teach news-writing by the Chinese Academy of Social Sciences. Aronson was the first American to be invited to teach such classes since the Communists came to power in 1949. In China he found that the content and style were what the Maoist government wanted to change about Chinese journalism, not the purpose.

Works 
 The Press and the Cold War (1970)
  Something to Guard: The Stormy Life of the National Guardian, 1948-1967. With Cedric Belfrage. New York: Columbia University Press, 1978.

References

External links
Times change; fifth remembered: The Nation; Dec. 27, 1986
Aronson Award at Hunter College
I Was a Polisher at a Chinese News Factory: Columbia Journalism Review, March/April 1996

20th-century American journalists
20th-century American writers
1915 births
1988 deaths
American male journalists
American newspaper reporters and correspondents
Boston Evening Transcript people
Columbia University Graduate School of Journalism alumni
Harvard College alumni
Hunter College faculty
Marxist journalists
New York Herald Tribune people
New York Post people
The New York Times writers